Hallgren is a surname. Notable people with the surname include:

Åke Hallgren (1918–2005), Swedish Olympic athlete
Eric Hallgren (1880–1956), Swedish police and civil servant
Frida Hallgren (born 1974), Swedish actress
Gary Hallgren (born 1945), American illustrator and underground cartoonist
Johan Hallgren (born 1975), Swedish musician
Konrad Hallgren (1891–1962), Swedish fascist
Mauritz A. Hallgren (1899–1956), American journalist, editor, and author
Sam Hallgren ( Sam Van Hallgren), former host of the podcast Filmspotting

See also
Mount Hallgren, mountain 27 miles southwest of Neumayer Cliffs in the Kirwan Escarpment, Queen Maud Land